Dundalk High School (DHS) is a four-year public high school in the United States, located in Baltimore County, Maryland. The school opened in 1959. Starting in 2010, DHS was rebuilt and combined with Sollers Point Technical High School. The new building opened in 2013.

About the school
Dundalk High School is located on Delvale Avenue in Dundalk, which is in the southeast part of Baltimore County and has roots back to 1888. In 1946, the former junior-senior high school building was opened. As the area's population grew, there was great need for a new high school. The high school building was originally built in 1959.

In 2010, the school district began construction on a new building to replace the aging infrastructure. The new facility opened on August 26, 2013, and houses both Dundalk High School and Sollers Point Technical High School. The new facility is modern and incorporates many environmentally beneficial features, such as automatic on-off lighting.

Academics
Dundalk High school received a 42.7 out of a possible 100 points (42%) on the 2018-2019 Maryland State Department of Education Report Card and received a 2 out of 5 star rating, ranking in the 18th percentile among all Maryland schools.

Students
The 2019–2020 enrollment at Dundalk High School was 1782 students.

The graduation rate at Dundalk High School peaked at 93% in 1999 and has dropped precipitously to 72.9% in 2014. The student population for 201819 was 1,621.

Student population history:

Athletics

State Championships
Boys Cross Country
Combined Class BCD 1946
Class AA 1961
Boys Soccer
Pre-MPSSAA Class B 1946
Pre-MPSSAA Class A 1948
One Class 1969, 1970
Class AA 1974
Boys Indoor Track
Class 3A 1990
Baseball
Class AA 1983

Notable alumni
 Mike Bielecki, former major league baseball player
 John Borozzi, former North American Soccer League and Major Indoor Soccer League, player. 

 Kevin Clash, muppeteer, creator/voice of Elmo on Sesame Street
 Louis L. DePazzo, former member of Maryland House of Delegates
 Bucky Lasek, professional skateboarder
 Joseph J. Minnick, member of Maryland House of Delegates
 Jacob J. Mohorovic, Jr, former member of Maryland House of Delegates
 James Parrish, former National Football League player
 E. J. Pipkin, former member of Maryland Senate
 John R. Schneider,  former member of Maryland Senate
 Bob Starr, semi-retired professional wrestler, trainer and manager
 Danny Wiseman, member of Professional Bowlers Association Hall of Fame

See also
List of schools in Baltimore County, Maryland

References

External links
Dundalk High School website

Educational institutions established in 1888
1888 establishments in Maryland
Public high schools in Maryland
Baltimore County Public Schools
Middle States Commission on Secondary Schools